Sulaf Fawakherji (born 27 July 1977) is a Syrian film, TV actress and director.

Career
She has played many roles on Syrian soap operas. Fawakherji studied art and sculpture at Adham Ismail Fine Arts Institute before starring on stage in plays including Al-Sawt (The Voice) and Hekayat al-Shetaa (Winter’s Tales). She was one of the torchbearer during the leg of the 2008 Summer Olympics torch relay.

She appeared on Syrian television in May 2011 in defence of Bashar Assad and the Syrian government during the civil war.

Personal life
She was married to actor Wael Ramadan from 1999 to April 2022, with whom she had two sons.

Selected filmography
 Al-Tirhal (1997)
 Nassim al-Roh (1998)
 Halim (2006)
 Hassiba (2008)
 The BabyDoll Night (2008)
 Asmahan (2008)
 Cleopatra (2010)
 Teen Wolf (2014)
 Chicago Street (2020)

References

External links

1977 births
Living people
People from Latakia
Syrian film actresses
Syrian television actresses
Syrian stage actresses
20th-century Syrian actresses
21st-century Syrian actresses
Syrian film directors
Syrian Alawites